Dan Beachy-Quick is an American poet, writer, and critic. He is the author of seven collections of poems, most recently, Variations on Dawn and Dusk (Omnidawn Publishing), longlisted for the 2019 National Book Awards, and other books including A Whaler’s Dictionary (Milkweed Editions), a collection of essays about Moby Dick. His honors include a Lannan Foundation Residency and a Guggenheim Fellowship.

His poems have appeared widely in literary journals, including The Boston Review, The New Republic, Fence, Poetry (magazine), Chicago Review, VOLT, The Colorado Review, Paris Review, and New American Writing, and in anthologies including Best American Poetry 2008 and in a chaplet, Sleep/Echo/Song (Wintered Press, 2006). His essays and reviews have appeared in The New York Times, The Southern Review, The Poker, Rain Taxi, The Denver Quarterly, Interim, and other venues. He serves as Poetry Advisor for the literary journal A Public Space.

Beachy-Quick was born in 1973 in Chicago, and grew up in Colorado and upstate New York.  His parents divorced when he was three and he was raised by his mother in Colorado, and spent summers in Ithaca, New York, with his father and grandparents.

He attended Hamilton College, the University of Denver, and the Iowa Writers' Workshop. He has taught writing at the School of the Art Institute of Chicago, and currently he is an assistant professor of English at Colorado State University. He lives in Fort Collins, Colorado with his wife and daughters.

Published works

Full-length poetry collections
 Library Of-- (Textshop Editions, 2021)
Variations on Dawn and Dusk (Omnidawn, 2019)
 gentleness (Tupelo Press, 2015)
 Circle's Apprentice (Tupelo Press, 2011)
 This Nest, Swift Passerine (Tupelo Press, 2009)
 Mulberry (Tupelo Press, 2006)
 Spell (Ahsahta Press, 2004)
 North True South Bright (Alice James Books, 2003)

Books
 Of Silence and Song (Milkweed Editions, 2017)
 An Impenetrable Screen of Purest Sky (Coffee House Press, 2013) 
 A Whaler’s Dictionary (Milkweed Editions, 2008)
 Wonderful Investigations: Essays, Meditations, Tales (Milkweed Editions, 2012)
 A Brighter Word Than Bright: Keats at Work (Muse Books, 2013)

Book-length collaborative projects
 Conversities (with Srikanth Reddy) (1913 Press, 2012) 
 Work from Memory (with Matthew Goulish) (Ahsahta Press, 2012)

Chapbooks

References

Sources
 Library of Congress Online Catalog
 Colorado State University > Faculty Bios

External links
 The Offending Adam > Dan Beachy-Quick & Srikanth Reddy from Canto
 Beachy-Quick reading at Northwestern University's 2nd Annual Spring Writers' Festival, 2009
 Tupelo Press > Author Page > Dan Beachy-Quick 
 Alice James Books > Author Page > Dan Beachy-Quick
 Ahsahta Press > Author Page: Dan Beachy-Quick
 The Boston Review > Review by Dan Beachy-Quick of The Radi Os,  by Ronald Johnson
 The New York Times > Modern Love: Disassembling My Childhood > By Dan Beachy-Quick > August 3, 2008
 Christopher Nelson's Poetry Blog > Interview with Dan Beachy-Quick on Overtakelessness > November 20, 2010

Poets from Colorado
University of Denver alumni
Iowa Writers' Workshop alumni
Colorado State University faculty
Writers from Fort Collins, Colorado
Living people
1973 births
21st-century American poets